Joseph Jean "Tizon" Bougie (January 11, 1886 – October 19, 1918) was a Canadian professional ice hockey and baseball player. He played one game with the Montreal Canadiens of the National Hockey Association in February 1912.

He played baseball in the Montreal City League with Montreal Voltigeurs in 1912  and with Valleyfield. At his death from Spanish flu in October 1918, he was described as one of the most effective and popular players with the Lachine team of the Ligue Nationale Independante de Baseball.  He was an outfielder and outstanding hitter.

References

External links
Jean Bougie at JustSportsStats

1886 births
1918 deaths
Canadian ice hockey centres
Ice hockey people from Quebec
Montreal Canadiens (NHA) players
Sportspeople from Salaberry-de-Valleyfield
Deaths from Spanish flu